Ann Foster Newmarch (9 June 1945 – 13 January 2022) , known as "Annie", was a South Australian painter, printmaker, sculptor and academic, with an international reputation, known for her community service to art, social activism and feminism. She co-founded the Progressive Art and the Women's Art Movement (WAM) in Adelaide, and is especially known for her iconic 1978 colour screenprint piece titled Women Hold Up Half the Sky!.

Early life and education 
Ann Foster Newmarch was born on 9 June 1945 in Adelaide, South Australia.

She graduated with a teaching diploma from the Western Teachers College in 1966 after three years' attendance there, after which she studied philosophy and psychology at Flinders University in Adelaide for a year.

She spent 1968 teaching art, at Croydon and Mitcham Girls High Schools, and became a lecturer at the South Australian School of Art in 1969, continuing there until 2000.

In 1973 to 1974 Newmarch continued to study philosophy, and also took subjects such as women's studies and politics and art at Flinders, as she evolved into an overtly political artist.

Career
Newmarch was one of the first female teachers at the South Australian School of Art, and was the first woman to be the subject of a retrospective exhibition at the Art Gallery of South Australia in 1997, The Personal is Political. She lived and worked in the inner-northern suburb of Prospect for around 50 years, working at her studio in Beatrice Street. She was the first person to be appointed artist-in-residence with City of Prospect.

In 1969 she held her first solo exhibition at the Robert Bolton Gallery in Adelaide, but criticised commercial galleries for being dominated by male artists and driven by the market.

Her striking image entitled Women Hold Up Half the Sky! (1978) had a huge impact on both her career and other artists, and is the most well-known of all her works. At the end of 1978, she started running screen-printing workshops Prospect studio, and also founded the Prospect Mural Group in that year.

In 1980, after a trip to the US and UK, Newmarch and other members of WAM painted Reclaim the Night for the Adelaide Festival of Arts, featuring women staging a street protest along with word art. She was the initiator of Stobie pole art in 1983, a practice which continues today.

In 1988, upon being invited to China along with Anne Morris on a Sino-Australian cultural exchange, the two Australian artists worked with four Chinese artists on a series of large murals in Xianyang, in Shaanxi province.

Art practice 
Newmarch's work is extensive and she did not hold to an individualistic  prescriptive signature style. She was introduced to the women’s movement in 1970 and balanced teaching, mothering and artmaking with community and cultural development work. She worked in painting, printmaking, and sculpture, but was especially known her experimental printmaking practice, sometimes using  personal imagery to make social and political points about the role of women in society.

Her art practice was concerned with the gendered basis of the world and is a practitioner whose work critiques underlying assumptions around understandings of gender. Embracing feminism from the early 1970s, her art practice highlights that all representation is political and the absence of voice is in itself an acceptance of the status quo. Her early work heavily featured silkscreen printing, a relatively cheap and accessible form of art, and one at which she excelled.

Later, in the 1990s, her work included more sculptural objects, and after that she focused on the objects being the subjects, allowing hands and the body to become canvases for the exploration of artmaking.

Her work has been described as political, feminist, emotional, personal, and complex. Her art practice epitomised "the personal is political", and included representations of women's unseen labour, motherhood, and other women's issues.  In an article in Lip: A Feminist Arts Journal (1981), Newmarch wrote that with her work she aimed to reach "women who are oppressed by sexism and people who are exploited by capitalism", and that her work was not aimed at "an 'elite educated' art gallery audience who can afford to ‘invest’ in art".

She later wrote:

Women Hold Up Half the Sky!
Newmarch's most well-known work, Women Hold Up Half the Sky! (1978) is a colour screenprint based on a photograph created in 1978, was so titled as a play on the phrase "Women hold up half the sky" made by former Chinese Communist Party chairman Mao Zedong.

Originally designed as a poster, it shows a photo of a middle-aged woman carrying a man in her arms, with the words written at the bottom. The woman in the photo was her Aunt Peggy, a single mother who raised eight children, and by the time of the artwork, had 23 grandchildren and seven great‑grandchildren. She much admired by Newmarch, seeing her as someone who lived an unconventional and feminist lifestyle, having mostly built a house on her own, learning the work usually done by tradespeople and doing it herself. The tiny 1940s snapshot on which the screenprint was based was "a little summer picture of something [Peggy] had done for a dare when a whole lot of people at a party had said ‘I bet you couldn’t lift your husband up’". Newmarch's work, which included adding Mao's famous quote, turned it into an empowering image for women. In it, she aimed to "show the strong encouraging aspects of women", in contrast to her earlier work focussing more on suburban alienation, and criticism of images of women in advertising.

Newmarch said of the work "It was never intended as an art image, it was intended as a confirming, joyful, cheap available poster"; however, it has had a huge impact, being exhibited all over Australia and the world.

Political activism 
Newmarch had a huge interest in politics, which always played a role in her work. Her work was infused with her social, political and environmental concerns, which included Aboriginal land rights. She was a significant figure in Adelaide's Women's Art Movement (WAM), founded on 7 August 1976.

Progressive Art Movement

Newmarch was co-founder in 1974 of the Progressive Art Movement (PAM), which focused on political issues, social concerns, and education, and included writers, artists, filmmakers and poets among its membership. Printmaker Ruth Faerber wrote when reviewing an exhibition of Adelaide art at the Art Gallery of NSW in 1977 that PAM was "motivated by a strong Marxist sociopolitical direction, agreed to a shared program for action and a sense of immediate imperative", compared with the Experimental Art Foundation, which did not commit to a set of agreed aims, and stated that they had an "open ended" attitude against mainstream, non-conformism as against entrenched doctrines, "experimentation as against patrician formalism".

Other artists associated with PAM included:

Robert Boynes 
Jim Crowley
Margaret Dodd
Bert Flugelman
Andrew Hill
Jenni Hill
Mandy Martin, painter, printmaker and teacher
Ken Searle
 Richard Turner

Andrew Hill (born 1952), is a painter, printmaker, theatre, film and graphic designer. He was associate professor at the UniSA 1979–2014, Director of the South Australian School of Art (2011–2014), and Associate Head of School at the School of Art, Architecture and Design at UniSA (2010–2014)

Recognition and awards 

 In 1989 Newmarch was awarded a Medal of the Order of Australia (OAM)  for her services to the arts.
On 22 September 2010, she was awarded the Australia Day Award for her photograph piece titled Women Hold Up Half the Sky, a production that shows how amazingly strong women are. The piece was a tribute to her Auntie Peg who built a house on her own while raising eight children and working two jobs, and was recreated as a postcard for four major galleries.
In October 2019, the City of Prospect renamed their community gallery (formerly the Prospect Gallery) the Newmarch Gallery, to honour her long involvement with community arts at the Community Association of Prospect and the Prospect Mural Group.
In December 2019, Newmarch was "Highly Commended" in the Geoff Crowhurst Memorial Award category at the South Australian Ruby Awards.

For individual works

Women Hold Up Half the Sky! (1978)
A major exhibition mounted by the National Gallery of Australia in 1995 was given its title, Women Hold Up Half the Sky, by Newmarch's print.
 2007: the only Australian work selected for the Museum of Contemporary Art Los Angeles' exhibition WACK! Art and the Feminist Revolution
 2020–21: included in the Know my Name exhibition  at the National Gallery of Australia

Death and legacy

Newmarch died peacefully on Thursday 13 January 2022. She was survived by her three children: Jake Newmarch, Bruno Medlin and Jessie Kerr.

She left a rich legacy of artwork, as well as raising awareness of many issues, and founding the Progressive Art Movement and mentoring many women artists. An obituary in ARTnews, an American visual arts magazine based in New York City, said that she had "reshaped the Australian art scene as an educator and activist".

In February 2022 Sydney artist Vivienne Binns called Newmarch a "giant", to whom she had yet to pay proper tribute.

Women Hold Up Half the Sky! became an icon of the feminist movement in Australia.

Stobie poles continue to be decorated in Adelaide.

Exhibitions
Newmarch's work was displayed in numerous galleries around Adelaide, including Greenaway Art Gallery (1994, 1995, 1996, 2001) and Prospect Gallery (1992, 1999, 2003, 2006, 2007, 2009).

The works Suburban window (1973) and Three months of interrupted work (1977), were included in significant feminist exhibitions, such as A Room of One’s Own (Melbourne, 1974) and The Women's Show (Adelaide, 1977).

Other notable exhibitions include:
As the Serpent Struggles, first held at the Experimental Art Foundation in 1987 and subsequently elsewhere
The Personal is Political, first and major retrospective, at AGSA, 1997
Anticipation, JamFactory Atrium and Prospect Gallery, 2005 to 2007
 WACK! Art and the Feminist Revolution at the Museum of Contemporary Art Los Angeles, 2007
Survey exhibition at the Northern Centre for Contemporary Art in Darwin, Northern Territory, 2017

Collections
Newmarch's artworks are held in all state galleries, including more than 40 works held by the Art Gallery of South Australia,  as well as in major private collections.

Major collections holding her work include:

 Art Gallery of South Australia
 Art Gallery of New South Wales
Australian War Museum
 Ballarat Fine Art Gallery
 Bendigo Art Gallery
 Luilichang Cultural Trust, Beijing, China
 City of Hamilton Art Gallery
 Flinders University Art Museum
 Griffith University
 Naracoorte Art Gallery
 National Gallery of Australia
 National Gallery of Victoria
 Newcastle Art Gallery
 Queen Victoria Museum and Art Gallery, Launceston, Tasmania
 Queensland Institute of Technology
 Riddoch Art Gallery, Mount Gambier
 SA Dept of the Premier and Cabinet
 University of Canberra
 University Art Museum, University of Queensland
 University of South Australia Art Museum, Adelaide
 University of Tasmania, Hobart
 Warrnambool Art Gallery

Footnotes

References

Further reading

1945 births
Living people
Australian feminists
Australian educators
Recipients of the Medal of the Order of Australia
20th-century Australian women artists
20th-century Australian artists
Artists from Adelaide
Artists from South Australia
Australian women painters